Shin Hyun-joon may refer to:

 Shin Hyun-joon (general) (1915–2007)
 Shin Hyun-joon (actor) (born 1968)
 Shin Hyun-joon (footballer) (born 1983): played in Indonesia and Malaysia. 
 Shin Hyoun-jun (born 1986): played for Gangwon FC
 Shin Hyun-jun (footballer) (born 1992) played for Bucheon FC 1995